The 13th Parliament of Lower Canada was in session from November 20, 1827, to September 2, 1830. Elections to the Legislative Assembly in Lower Canada had been held in July 1827. The legislature was dissolved in 1830 due to the death of King George IV. All sessions were held at Quebec City.

References

External links 
  Assemblée nationale du Québec (French)
Journals of the House of Assembly of Lower Canada ..., John Neilson (1827)

Parliaments of Lower Canada
1827 establishments in Lower Canada
1830 disestablishments in Lower Canada